Torgny (Gaumais: Toûrgny) is a village of Wallonia and a district of the municipality of Rouvroy, located in the province of Luxembourg, Belgium. 

It has about 200 inhabitants and is the southernmost place of Belgium. Till 1977 Torgny was a municipality.

The river Chiers borders the municipality of Rouvroy near Torgny.

References 
  Official website Rouvroy

Belgium–France border crossings
Former municipalities of Luxembourg (Belgium)
Rouvroy, Belgium